RAT!hammock are an Australian indie-rock band from Melbourne.

History 
The band was formed in 2017 and played their first gig at The Grace Darling Hotel while they were developing their sound. They have had several members rotate in and out since forming, but currently consist of Jackson Phelan, Tom Dowling, Jack Nicolson, and Dom Buckham. Their first release with this lineup was 2020's Word Of The Day.

In 2018 they toured with Last Dinosaurs and played St Jerome's Laneway Festival and Falls Festival in 2019. They have received airplay on radio stations Triple J, FBi Radio, and 3RRR, and were #29 in the 50 most-played artists on Triple J Unearthed Radio for 2018, and #24 in 2019.

In 2021 they performed for Rolling Stone Australia's 'In My Room'.

Members 

 Jackson Phelan (guitar & vocals)
 Dom Buckham (bass)
 Tom Dowling (guitar)
 Jack Nicholson (drums)

Past members

 Michael Cooper (bass)
 Sean Conran (bass)

Discography 
Albums

 Everything, All At Once, Forever (2020)

Charts

AMRAP Charts 
Australian Music Radio Airplay Project (AMRAP) are managed by Community Broadcasting Association of Australia. The Regional Charts reflect the most downloaded tracks through Amrap by broadcasters in regional locations, while the Metro Charts reflect metropolitan community broadcasters.

 2018 - June - #3 - Regional Chart
 2019 - Pick Up - #1 - Metro Chart

References 

Musical groups from Melbourne